Rastislav Michalík (born 14 January 1974) is a Slovak football player.

Michalík moved in 1995 to the Czech Republic to play for FK Fotbal Třinec. He gradually progressed and played for FC Slovan Liberec and Sparta Prague in the Czech First League. In 2003, he won the Czech championship with Sparta. In 2005 Michalík moved briefly to Turkey and played also in Austria before moving back to Slovakia in 2007. He currently plays for FK Slávia Staškov in Slovak lower division.

Honours

Club
 Slovan Liberec
Czech Cup: 1999–2000

References

External links
 

Slovak footballers
Slovakia international footballers
1974 births
Living people
FC Spartak Trnava players
SV Ried players
Czech First League players
FK Fotbal Třinec players
1. FK Příbram players
FC Slovan Liberec players
AC Sparta Prague players
Kayserispor footballers
Slovak Super Liga players
Slovak expatriate footballers
Slovak expatriate sportspeople in Austria
Slovak expatriate sportspeople in Turkey
Expatriate footballers in the Czech Republic
Expatriate footballers in Austria
Expatriate footballers in Turkey
Association football midfielders
FK Dukla Banská Bystrica players
FK Čadca players
People from Čadca District
Sportspeople from the Žilina Region